Cliff Hagan Stadium (Officially named Shively Field at Cliff Hagan Stadium) is a baseball stadium located in Lexington, Kentucky, United States. Cliff Hagan Stadium or better known to Kentucky Wildcat baseball fans as “The Cliff” is on the Southwest side of the University’s campus, two blocks away from Kroger Field. Since its opening in 1969, the University of Kentucky Baseball called this place home for just under 50 years. The Wildcat’s then opened a 49 million dollar baseball stadium called Kentucky Proud Park in 2019. Cliff Hagan Stadium had 7 coaches during its time and 15 All Americans. The stadium was renamed in 1993 in honor of Cliff Hagan, the Basketball Hall of Famer who had played at Kentucky during the 1950s under Adolph Rupp and returned to Kentucky as athletic director after his professional basketball playing days. It was extensively renovated in 2002. Following its final 2018 season, while construction was ongoing on its nearby replacement, it was used for UK baseball summer camps. In 2021, “The Cliff” has been an abandoned stadium for over 2 years and is not in use. 

In the wake of the Wildcats' surprising success in the 2006 season, which saw them win a regular-season Southeastern Conference title for the first time in over 30 years, coach John Cohen was signed to a five-year contract extension. A clause in the contract commits the university to either renovating or replacing the stadium. If construction on a new or renovated stadium does not start in 2008 or sooner, Cohen was free to walk away from the contract without a financial penalty. However, Cohen left the program at the end of the 2008 season for his alma mater Mississippi State, where he served as athletic director from 2016-2022. His assistant Gary Henderson was then given the head coaching job.

Cliff Hagan Stadium Today 
Cliff Hagan stadium held its last game on May 13th, 2018. Following the 2018 season and the stadiums closing summer camps were held at "The Cliff" for one more summer. But, in 2019 the University of Kentucky totally abandoned this stadium even through having a 4.2 million. dollar renovation in 2002. Today it lays as a post-apocalyptic waste land on the edge of campus. The infield and outfield are now covered with trees and weeds. Major renovation would be needed to make anything of this once beloved stadium. The university has had many ideas for the land, wanting to create it into a tennis or swimming facility.

Stadium Records 

 Longest Winning Streak: 12 (2012)
 Most Runs Scored by UK: 27 vs. Tennessee-Martin (March 10, 2007)
 Most Runs Scored by Both Teams: 44 - Mississippi State 28, Kentucky 16 (1989)
 SEC Series Sweeps (3 game series): 12
 SEC Series Wins (3 game series): 45

All-Americans

List of Coaches at Cliff Hagan Stadium

References

External links
Official description at UKAthletics.com

Defunct college baseball venues in the United States
Kentucky Wildcats baseball
Sports venues in Lexington, Kentucky
Buildings at the University of Kentucky
Baseball venues in Kentucky
1969 establishments in Kentucky
Sports venues completed in 1969